João Amorim may refer to:

 João Amorim (footballer, born 1991), Portuguese football defender
 João Amorim (footballer, born February 1992), Portuguese football midfielder
 João Amorim (footballer, born July 1992), Portuguese football defender